Gravenhurst (Morrison Lake) Water Aerodrome  is located on Morrison Lake, and is  west southwest of Gravenhurst, Ontario, Canada.

References

Registered aerodromes in Ontario
Seaplane bases in Ontario